Michael Bunting (born September 17, 1995) is a Canadian professional ice hockey winger for the  Toronto Maple Leafs of the National Hockey League (NHL).

Playing career
Bunting played midget hockey with the Don Mills Flyers in the Greater Toronto Hockey League and captured the league championship during the 2012–13 season. The Sault Ste. Marie Greyhounds selected him 160th overall in the 2013 OHL Priority Selection. 

Playing as a rookie with the Greyhounds in 2013–14, Bunting produced 42 points in 48 games. During the 2014–15 season, Bunting led the Greyhounds with 37 goals in 57 games and served as an alternate captain.

Arizona Coyotes (2015–2021)

The Arizona Coyotes made Bunting their fourth-round pick, 117th overall, in the 2014 NHL Entry Draft. He signed a three-year entry-level contract with the Coyotes on July 23, 2015.

Bunting made the jump to the Coyotes' professional ranks in the 2015–16 season with the Springfield Falcons of the American Hockey League (AHL). The Coyotes briefly assigned him to the ECHL's Rapid City Rush early in the season but he returned in time to record his first AHL goal in a game against the Providence Bruins on December 6, 2015.

Bunting became a restricted free agent after the expiry of his entry-level contract. He signed a one-year, two-way deal to stay with the Coyotes on July 14, 2018. While playing with the Tucson Roadrunners in the 2018–19 season, Bunting made his 200th AHL appearance on October 13, 2018, in a game against the Bakersfield Condors.

The Coyotes recalled Bunting to the NHL for the first time on December 8, 2018. At the time, he ranked second on the Roadrunners with 18 points in 20 games. Bunting scored his first NHL goal in his debut, beating Boston Bruins goaltender Tuukka Rask in the second period of a 4–3 Coyotes loss on December 11, 2018.

After spending the entire 2019–20 season with the Roadrunners, Bunting returned to the Coyotes' lineup on March 31, 2021, and spent the rest of the 2020–21 season in the NHL. He registered a goal and an assist in his season debut, a 9–3 Coyotes loss to the Colorado Avalanche, before scoring his first NHL hat-trick against the Los Angeles Kings on April 5, 2021. Despite playing just 21 games with the Coyotes in 2020–21, Bunting ultimately tied with Nick Schmaltz for sixth on the team with 10 goals.

Toronto Maple Leafs (2021–present)

As a group 6 free agent after breaking out with the Coyotes, Bunting was signed to a two-year, $1.9 million contract with the Toronto Maple Leafs on July 28, 2021. He left the Coyotes franchise being the Roadrunner's all-time leader in games played, goals, assists, points, and penalty minutes. Bunting spent most of the season as the left winger on the team's top line with Auston Matthews and Mitch Marner. On January 29, 2022, Bunting became the first player to score a hat-trick the same day his hometown was featured on Scotiabank Hockey Day in Canada. In his first year with the Maple Leafs, Bunting was named as a finalist for the Calder Memorial Trophy for the league's best rookie. Although he would not ultimately win the award, Bunting was voted to the NHL All-Rookie Team.

International play

Team Canada general manager, Roberto Luongo, invited Bunting to participate at the 2021 IIHF World Championship following the 2020–21 season, giving him his first opportunity to represent his home country on an international stage.

Personal life
Bunting was born in the Toronto suburb of Scarborough to his parents Andy, a civil servant for the City of Toronto, and Lynda, a bookkeeper at Shoppers Drug Mart. Andy and Lynda divorced early and Michael was primarily raised by his mother, a breast cancer survivor. He has an older brother, Christopher.

Career statistics

Regular season and playoffs

International

References

External links

1995 births
Living people
Arizona Coyotes draft picks
Arizona Coyotes players
Canadian ice hockey left wingers
Rapid City Rush players
Sault Ste. Marie Greyhounds players
Sportspeople from Scarborough, Toronto
Ice hockey people from Toronto
Springfield Falcons players
Toronto Maple Leafs players
Tucson Roadrunners players